"The Moon is made of green cheese" is a statement referring to a fanciful belief that the Moon is composed of cheese. In its original formulation as a proverb and metaphor for credulity with roots in fable, this refers to the perception of a simpleton who sees a reflection of the Moon in water and mistakes it for a round cheese wheel. It is widespread as a folkloric motif among many of the world's cultures, and the notion has also found its way into children's folklore and modern popular culture.

The phrase "green cheese" in the common version of this proverb (sometimes "cream cheese" is used), may refer to a young, unripe cheese or to cheese with a greenish tint.

There was never an actual historical popular belief that the Moon is made of green cheese (cf. Flat Earth and the myth of the Flat Earth). It was typically used as an example of extreme credulity, a meaning that was clear and commonly understood as early as 1638.

Fable
There exists a family of stories, in comparative mythology in diverse countries that concern a simpleton who sees a reflection of the Moon and mistakes it for a round cheese:

The Wolf and the Fox story type
This folkloric motif is first recorded in literature during the High Middle Ages by the French rabbi Rashi with a Rabbinic parable in his commentary weaving together three Biblical quotations given in the main text (including one on "sour grapes") into a reconstruction of some of the Talmudic Rabbi Meir's supposed three hundred fox fables ("משלות שועלים", in later works "משלי שועלים"), in the tractate Sanhedrin:

Rashi as the first literary reference may reflect the well-known beast fable tradition of French folklore or a more obscure such tradition in Jewish folklore (see also the tradition in Berechiah ha-Nakdan); the near-contemporary Iraqi rabbi Hai Gaon also reconstructed this Rabbi Meir tale, sharing some elements of Rashi's story, but with a lion caught in a trapping pit rather than a wolf in a well – however, Rashi may have actively "adapted contemporary [French] folklore to the [T]almudic passage", as was homiletically practiced in different Jewish communities. Though the tale itself is probably of non-Jewish European origin, Rashi's form and elements are likely closer to the original in oral folklore than the somewhat later variation recorded featuring Reynard. Rashi's version already includes the fox, the wolf, the well and the Moon that are seen in later versions. Petrus Alphonsi, a Spanish Jewish convert to Christianity, popularized this tale in Europe in his collection Disciplina Clericalis.

The variation featuring Reynard the Fox appeared soon after Petrus Alphonsi in the French classic Le Roman de Renart (as "Renart et Ysengrin dans le puits" in Branch IV); the Moon/cheese element is absent (it is replaced by a promise of Paradise at the bottom of the well), but such a version is alluded to in another part of the collection. This was the first Reynard tale to be adapted into English (as the Middle English "þe Vox and þe Wolf"), preceding Chaucer's "The Nun's Priest's Tale" and the much later work of William Caxton. Later still, the Middle Scots The Fox, the Wolf and the Husbandman does include the Moon/cheese element. La Fontaine includes the story in the French classic compilation Fables ("Le Loup et le Renard" in Book XI).  The German tale of The Wolf and the Fox in Grimm replaces the well with a well-stocked cellar, where a newly satiated wolf is trapped and subject to the farmer's revenge, being now too overstuffed to escape through the exit.

One of the facets of this morphology is grouped as "The Wolf Dives into the Water for Reflected Cheese" (Type 34) of the Aarne–Thompson classification of folktales, where the Moon's reflection is mistaken for cheese, in the section devoted to tales of The Clever Fox. It can also be grouped as "The Moon in the Well" (Type 1335A), in the section devoted to Stories about a Fool, referring to stories where the simpleton believes the Moon itself is a tangible object in the water.

Proverb
"The Moon is made of green cheese" was one of the most popular proverbs in 16th- and 17th-century English literature, and it was also in use after this time. It likely originated in this formulation in 1546, when The Proverbs of John Heywood claimed "the moon is made of a greene cheese." A common variation at that time was "to make one believe the Moon is made of green cheese" (i.e., to hoax), as seen in John Wilkins'book The Discovery of a World in the Moone.

In French, there is the proverb "Il veut prendre la lune avec les dents" ("He wants to take the moon with his teeth"), alluded to in Rabelais.

The characterization is also common in stories of gothamites, including the Moonrakers of Wiltshire, who were said to have taken advantage of this trope, and the assumption of their own naivete, to hide their smuggling activities from government officials.

Childlore
A 1902 survey of childlore by psychologist G. Stanley Hall in the United States found that though most young children were unsure of the Moon's composition, that it was made of cheese was the single most common explanation:

Before that time, and since, the idea of the Moon actually being made of cheese has appeared as a humorous conceit in much of children's popular culture with astronomical themes (cf. the Man in the Moon), and in adult references to it.

In epistemology
At the Science Writers' conference, theoretical physicist Sean M. Carroll explained why there was no need to "sample the moon to know it's not made of cheese." He said the hypothesis is "absurd", failing against our knowledge of the universe and, "This is not a proof, there is no metaphysical proof, like you can proof a statement in logic or math that the moon is not made of green cheese. But science nevertheless passes judgments on claims based on how well they fit in with the rest of our theoretical understanding." Notwithstanding this uncontrovertible argument, the harmonic signature of moon rock  the seismic velocity at which shockwaves travel  is said to be closer to green cheese than to any rock on earth.

Dennis Lindley used the myth to help explain the necessity of Cromwell's rule in Bayesian probability: "In other words, if a decision-maker thinks something cannot be true and interprets this to mean it has zero probability, he will never be influenced by any data, which is surely absurd. So leave a little probability for the moon being made of green cheese; it can be as small as 1 in a million, but have it there since otherwise an army of astronauts returning with samples of the said cheese will leave you unmoved."

In pop culture 
In A Grand Day Out, the plot hinges on Wallace and Gromit going to the Moon to gather cheese due to a lack of it at home on a bank holiday.

See also

 Cheese Factories on the Moon
 Cromwell's rule
 Face value
 Giant impact hypothesis for theories on the origin and make up of the Moon
 History of cheese
 Ipse dixit—compare
 Little Cheese (real name Chester Cheese), fictional character in the DC comic, featuring a type of cheese found on the Moon by an astronaut
Man in the Moon
 Moon in fiction
 Moonrakers of Wiltshire
 Olivine
 Skepticism
 Splitting of the Moon

References

Notes

Citations

Bibliography

 
 
 

Moon myths
English proverbs
Cheese
Metaphors referring to food and drink